Violinist William Hennessy was the founder of the Australian String Quartet. He led the quartet from its formation in 1985 until 1996. Since 2006 he has been Artistic Director of the Melbourne Chamber Orchestra, the orchestra which Jeffrey Crellin founded in 1991 under its original name Australia Pro Arte Chamber Orchestra.

But for over 30 years William Hennessy has seen advocacy of the music of Douglas Weiland as his primary artistic responsibility. In 2018 he created THE WEILAND PROJECT in order to bring the music of Douglas Weiland to world attention for the reference and pleasure of present and future generations.

William Hennessy was closely associated with the development of next-generation Australian chamber music ensembles such the TinAlley Quartet, Flinders Quartet, Hamer Quartet and the Seraphim Trio and has been a mentor to many string players who are now at the forefront of Australian professional musical life. He remains deeply committed to musicians of the future.

Other positions previously held include Head of Strings at the University of Melbourne, Concertmaster of the Tasmanian Symphony Orchestra, deputy leader and founder member of the Australian Chamber Orchestra, member of the London based Academy of St Martin in the Fields, faculty member of ANAM, and founder/director of the Tasmanian Symphony Chamber Players, the Melbourne University Chamber Orchestra and the Adelaide Youth Chamber Orchestra.

William Hennessy continues to advocate for the music of the Australian composers Richard Mills AM, Calvin Bowman and Benjamin Martin.

He has made over 250 concerto appearances and has long been recognised as one of Australia's leading violinists and music educators. He has performed in forty-five countries..

In June 2018 William Hennessy was appointed a Member of the Order of Australia for his services to music.

References

External links 
 http://www.mco.org.au
 William Hennessy's Website

Living people
Australian classical violinists
Male classical violinists
Australian educators
Concertmasters
Year of birth missing (living people)
21st-century classical violinists
21st-century Australian male musicians
21st-century Australian musicians